Duval N'Zembi (born 12 October 1988) is a Gabonese professional footballer who currently plays as a forward for Bohemian Football League club SK Zápy.

External links 
 
 Duval N'Zembi at NFT
 Duval N'Zembi at Footballdatabase
 Duval N'Zembi at ZeroZero

1988 births
Living people
Gabonese footballers
Gabon international footballers
Gabonese expatriate footballers
US Bitam players
FC 105 Libreville players
Missile FC players
FC Fastav Zlín players
FK Frýdek-Místek players
Gabonese expatriate sportspeople in France
Expatriate footballers in France
Expatriate footballers in the Czech Republic
Association football forwards
21st-century Gabonese people
Gabon A' international footballers
Gabonese expatriate sportspeople in the Czech Republic
2014 African Nations Championship players